Fadrique Alfonso of Castile, 1st Señor de Haro (1334–1358), 25th Master of the Order of Santiago (1342–1358), was the fifth illegitimate child of Alfonso XI of Castile and Eleanor of Guzman.  He was born in Seville.

Biography
Fadrique was a twin to Henry of Trastámara. While his father lived, the children of Eleanor de Guzman, the king's favorite, profited from appointments and royal grants. With this backing, in 1342, Fadrique rose to the leading role of Maestre of the militant monastic Order of Santiago. The prior Maestre had been Alonso Meléndez de Guzmán, his maternal uncle.In 1354, Fadrique was granted the role as custodian (Adelantado Mayor de la Frontera) of the Portuguese frontier.  The rebelling Count Henry of Trastamara took refuge in the French court of Jean II after he was cornered in Asturias in 1354, and the count sought support from the French monarchy. Fadrique did not join his brother's rebellion until much later, during the War of Two Peters (Aragon vs. Castile).

When Alfonso XI died from the Black Death, during a siege of Gibraltar. The sons of Dona Eleanor Guzman rebelled after the king's death, refusing to acknowledge the new heir, Pedro I of Castile, who was fifteen years-old at the time. During the reign of King Alfonso XI, Dona Eleanor de Guzman (the king's favorite concubine) had taken Queen Maria of Portugal's place at many important events, thus causing bad feelings between the two. Queen Maria of Portugal was regent for one year after her husband's death.  When Dona Eleanor's sons' rebelled Count Jao de Albuquerque easily convinced the Queen Mother that Eleanor de Guzman had played a part in the rebellion, and not needing much prodding, Dona Eleanor was executed. The subsequent execution of Eleanor in Talavera in 1351, added more fuel to the fire of the rebellion by Guzman's sons, in particular her fourth born, Count Henry of Trastamara, who through marriage, ruled the northeastern portion of the kingdom. The future Henry II of Castile and Leon, had several brothers: Fadrique, Tello of Castile, and Sancho of Castile. Through a combination of threats and diplomacy, Peter I of Castile was able to elicit fealty and a temporary reconciliation with his half-brothers. But this was not to last. Master Fadrique of The Order of Santiago, a religious knight, was named royal emissary to Bourbon, France, when he went to escort Pedro's bride-to-be, Blanche of Bourbon.  There were rumors he had slept with his brother's bride. “Just what had happened, it is somewhat difficult to discover, and the story is told that the king, listening to scandalous talk, was made to believe that his royal messenger and half-brother, Fadrique, had played the role of Sir Tristan as he had brought the lady back and that she had been a somewhat willing Isolde.” Women of Romance Countries, John Effinger (2021). The subsequent turmoil of this marriage and Pedro's entanglement with his concubine, María de Padilla, who King Pedro later swore he had married in a secret ceremony, was unlikely to have help cement a relationship between King Pedro and Master Fadrique.

Fadrique died when he joined the rebellion on the frontier during the War with Aragon, when he was fighting with his brother Tello. A propaganda legend was created that one finds in many manuscripts which claims that he and his knights met with the king in Seville, while paying visits to the King's mistress, Maria de Padilla. He was then apprehended and killed by being tossed out the window while the king ate his lunch. This legend is in reality the real-life death of the exiled Prince Jean of Aragon, the king's cousin, who was plotting to take the throne as the king had no acknowledged legitimate heirs, as yet. Jean foolishly thought King Pedro I would make him the Lord of Vizcaya and dimwittedly met with the autocratic king, who had no intention of handing over a valuable part of his kingdom to him. Prince Jean of Aragon, after angering the king, was promptly killed by being thrown out the window, which Ayala then used later in his propaganda by stating the king yelled as the prince's body fell, "Here is your Lord of Vizcaya!" Propagandists then made this Master Fadrique's death and kept out a lot of the historical details, such as the War of Two Pedros, between Aragon and France vs. Castile and Navarre, which was taking place at the time, known as the One Hundred Years War.

After M. Fadrique de Guzman died in battle, his body was most likely interred in a church nearby in Aragon.  In 1579, his mortal remains were transferred to the crypt of the royal chapel, probably by order of the Trastamara ruler, to the Cathedral in Seville where they remain to this day.

Descendants
As Maester of the Order of Santiago, Fadrique was putatively required to remain celibate. Through illegitimate marriages he fathered the lineage of the Enríquez family, who became Admirals of Castile and later Dukes of Medina de Rioseco.

By an unknown woman (possibly a Sephardic Jewish woman named Paloma), he had one illegitimate son: 
 Alfonso Enríquez de Castilla (b. 1354, d. 1429), 1st Señor de Medina de Río Seco, married to Juana de Mendoza (b. circa 1360, d. January 24, 1431), had issue

By Leonor de Angulo y Córdoba (b. ), a Castilian noblewoman, he had two illegitimate children: 
 Pedro Enríquez de Castilla (b. 1355, d. May 5, 1400), 1st Conde de Trastámara, 2nd Constable of Castile, married in 1385 to Isabel de Castro (b. circa 1360), had issue
 Leonor Enríquez de Castilla (b. circa 1357), married to Diego Gómez Sarmiento, Marshall of Castile (b. circa 1355, d. August 14, 1385), had issue.

His descendant Juana Enriquez (1425 – February 13, 1468), was the second wife of John II of Aragon and the mother of Ferdinand II of Aragon.

Ancestors

References

1334 births
1358 deaths
People from Seville
14th-century Castilians
Assassinated royalty
Grand Masters of the Order of Santiago
Castilla
Sons of kings